Fastlane or fast lane or Fast Lane may refer to:
 Fast Lane (video game), a 1987 Konami arcade game
 WWE Fastlane, a professional wrestling event
 Fastlane (2015)
 Fastlane (2016)
 Fastlane (2017)
 Fastlane (2018)
 Fastlane (2019)

Transportation and technology 
 Fast Lane (E-ZPass), a branding used for the E-ZPass system in Massachusetts from 1998 to 2012
 Fast Lane (Cedar Fair), a fast pass system at Cedar Fair amusement parks
 Passing lane or fast lane, a lane on a multi-lane highway or motorway closest to the center of the road
 FastLane Technologies, a company acquired in 2001 by Quest Software
 Fastlane, a blog by Bob Lutz of General Motors

Music 
 Fastlane (band), a British rock band
 "Fastlane" (song), a 2005 song by Esthero
 "Fast Lane" (Bad Meets Evil song), 2011
 "Fast Lane" (Bilal song), 2001
"Fastlane", a song by Nico Santos
 "Fast Lane", a song by E-40 from the 2012 album The Block Brochure: Welcome to the Soil 1
 "Fastlane", a song by Lindsay Lohan from the 2005 album A Little More Personal (Raw)
 "Fast Lane", a song by Megadeth from the 2011 album Thirteen
 "Fast Lane", a song by Urban Dance Squad from the 1990 album Mental Floss for the Globe

Television
 The Fast Lane, a 1985–1987 Australia comedy crime series
 Fastlane (TV series), a 2002–2003 American action/crime drama series
 "Fast Lane" (The Flash), an episode in the second season of The Flash

See also
 Faslane (disambiguation)
 Local-express lanes, an arrangement of roadways within a major highway that allows drivers to choose lanes with fewer interchanges